Japanese Tea Garden may refer to:

Japanese Tea Garden (San Francisco), a feature of Golden Gate Park, California
Fort Worth Japanese Garden, a Japanese garden in the Fort Worth Botanic Garden, Texas
Portland Japanese Garden, a traditional Japanese garden in Portland, Oregon
San Antonio Japanese Tea Garden, a garden in Brackenridge Park, San Antonio, Texas
Seattle Japanese Garden, a Japanese garden in the Madison Park neighborhood of Seattle, Washington

See also
Japanese garden, a traditional, often highly stylized, garden
Japanese tea ceremony, a Japanese cultural activity involving the ceremonial preparation of green tea
Chashitsu, architectural spaces designed to be used for tea ceremony
Roji, the Japanese term for the garden through which one passes to the chashitsu
Tea garden (disambiguation)